Rowley is a town in Essex County, Massachusetts, United States. The population was 6,161 at the 2020 census.

Part of the town comprises the census-designated place of Rowley.

History
The area was inhabited by the Agawam people under sachem Masconomet. Although the area that would become Rowley was colonized by English settlers starting in 1639, it was not until 1700 that the town would pay Masoconomet's heirs nine pounds for a quitclaim deed.

In spring of 1638 Rowley was originally colonized as a plantation by Reverend Ezekiel Rogers, who had arrived from England on the ship John of London with approximately twenty families. The John of London also brought over the first printing press in the colonies, which was later brought to Harvard University.

The following fall, on September 4, 1639, the town was incorporated, and included portions of modern-day Byfield, Groveland, Georgetown, and Haverhill. The town was named after Rowley, East Riding of Yorkshire, where Rogers had served as pastor for twenty years before his suspension due to non-conformist Puritan beliefs. Rogers was installed as Rowley's pastor on December 3.

1643 and 1645 saw the construction of a fulling mill and grist mill, respectively. The town became known for its hemp and flax cloth, as well as cotton. In 1642, a keystone arch bridge and a dam were built on the Mill River for the fulling mill, the first such in the colonies. The bridge was the first stone arch bridge in North America, constructed entirely of hand-chiseled granite and contained no mortar. It was rebuilt in the mid-19th century. In 1669, a sawmill was established in town and is still in business today. A wagon factory was built in 1868 by Moses E. Daniels. Later, at the start of the 20th century, the town had a booming shoe industry, as well as successful boat building businesses.

Education
Rowley serves one public elementary school, the Pine Grove Elementary School, located in town center. Middle school students attend Triton Regional Middle School, and high school students attend Triton Regional High School along with Newbury, and Salisbury.

Geography
Rowley lies along the Atlantic Ocean north of Cape Ann, the mainland separated from the ocean by a small portion of Plum Island and Plum Island Sound. The island and a portion of the marshes south of Mud Creek (part of the town's northern border) are protected as part of the Parker River National Wildlife Refuge. The town has other portions which are protected, including parts of the Mill Creek Wildlife Management Area, the Georgetown-Rowley State Forest, the Willowdale State Forest, the Arthur Ewell Reservation, and the Bay Circuit Trail. Much of the eastern mainland part of town is marshy, feeding Mud Creek, Mill River and the Rowley River, which constitutes part of the town's southern border.

It is bordered to the north by Newbury, to the northwest by Georgetown, to the west by Boxford, and to the south by Ipswich.

Interstate 95 passes through the western end of town, with the nearest exits being in Georgetown and Boxford.  U.S. Route 1, known as the Newburyport Turnpike in the area, passes near the geographic center of town, and Massachusetts Route 1A passes through the eastern part of town, through the town center.  All three roads are connected by Massachusetts Route 133, which passes from west to east through the town, becoming coextensive with Route 1A just north of the Ipswich town line and heading south with it.

Rowley is one of the stations along the Newburyport/Rockport Line of the MBTA Commuter Rail, providing service between Newburyport to the North Shore and Boston's North Station.  The nearest national air service can be found at Boston's Logan International Airport, though Plum Island Airport, a small general aviation airport, is located in neighboring Newburyport.

Climate

Demographics

As of the census of 2000, there were 5,500 people, 1,958 households, and 1,468 families residing in the town. The racial makeup of the town was 98.38% White, 0.24% Black or African American, 0.25% Native American, 0.45% Asian, 0.27% from other races, and 0.40% from two or more races. Hispanic or Latino of any race were 0.85% of the population.

There were 1,958 households, out of which 39.0% had children under the age of 18 living with them, 64.5% were married couples living together, 7.7% had a female householder with no husband present, and 25.0% were non-families. 20.1% of all households were made up of individuals, and 7.3% had someone living alone who was 65 years of age or older.  The average household size was 2.77 and the average family size was 3.23.

In the town, the population was spread out, with 28.0% under the age of 18, 5.9% from 18 to 24, 32.5% from 25 to 44, 24.3% from 45 to 64, and 9.4% who were 65 years of age or older.  The median age was 38 years. For every 100 females, there were 97.8 males.  For every 100 females age 18 and over, there were 92.1 males.

The median income for a household in the town was $62,130, and the median income for a family was $75,527. Males had a median income of $49,970 versus $32,500 for females. The per capita income for the town was $27,413.  About 3.3% of families and 4.1% of the population were below the poverty line, including 5.8% of those under age 18 and 11.4% of those age 65 or over.

Literature
Rowley is the town that the protagonist flees to from fictional Innsmouth in the H. P. Lovecraft short story "The Shadow Over Innsmouth". In the story, Innsmouth is located to the southeast of Rowley.

Rowley is also featured in Chapter Three of The American Pageant, by Thomas A. Bailey, an American history textbook often used in AP United States History courses.

In Chesapeake, James Michener lists Rowley as one of several towns in the 17th century where Quakers were whipped in the town common en route to expulsion into Rhode Island.

In The Nightmare Murders, Ken Blaisdell sets the story about tracking down a serial killer in his original hometown of Rowley.

Rowley lends its namesake to the character of the same name from the Diary of a Wimpy Kid series by Jeff Kinney

In Popular Culture
The 1947 film 13 Rue Madeleine was filmed in part at the site of the Fenno Estate in Rowley.

Notable people

 Jacob Bailey, author and clergyman of the Church of England
 Jeremiah Chaplin, 1st President of Colby College
 Parker Cleaveland, geologist and mineralogist
 Henry Harriman, one of the First Seven Presidents of the Seventy of the Church of Jesus Christ of Latter Day Saints
 Bruce Kimball, retired NFL football player for the Washington Redskins and New York Giants
 Edward Kimball (1823-1901), Sunday School teacher and church debt raiser
 Eddie MacDonald, NASCAR driver
 Jerry Moses, former catcher for the Boston Red Sox
 Josiah Little Pickard, educator
 Nathaniel Prime, merchant and banker based in New York City, pioneer in specializing in trading securities
 Margaret Scott, hanged during the Salem witch trial
 John S. Tenney, former Justice of the Maine Supreme Judicial Court

See also

 List of mill towns in Massachusetts

References

External links

 Town of Rowley official website
 
 
 
 Walker, George. 1884 Atlas of Essex County. 1884 Map of Rowley. Published 1884 by George Walker.
 Vital Records of Rowley to 1849. Originally published by the Essex Institute. Transcribed and put online by John Slaughter and Jodi Salero 2007.

 
Rowley